Bulbaeolidia is a genus of marine nudibranch in the family Aeolidiidae.

Species
Species in the genus Bulbaeolidia include:
 Bulbaeolidia alba (Risbec, 1928)
 Bulbaeolidia japonica (Eliot, 1913)
 Bulbaeolidia oasis Caballer & Ortea, 2015
 Bulbaeolidia sulphurea Caballer & Ortea, 2015

References

Aeolidiidae